The 2018 Seoul Dynasty season was the first season of the Seoul Dynasty's existence in the Overwatch League. The team finished with a regular season record of 22–18, placing them eighth overall, behind the Houston Outlaws due to tiebreakers, who had the same record. Seoul did not qualify for any of the Stage Playoffs and did not qualify for the Season Playoffs.

Preceding offseason 
On August 21, 2017, the team announced the acquisition of the players and coaching staff of Korean Overwatch esports team Lunatic-Hai, which consisted of the following players:
Kim "EscA" In-jae
Ryu "ryujehong" Je-hong
Yang "tobi" Jin-mo
Kim "zunba" Joon-hyeok
Moon "gido" Gi-do
Gong "Miro" Jin-hyuk

In September, the team signed an additional coach in veteran Kim "nuGget" Yo-han. In late October, they revealed 3 additional players to their Seoul-based roster, Kim "Fleta" Byung-sun, Byeon "Munchkin" Sang-beom, and Koo "xepheR" Jae-mo. On October 27, the addition of Choi "Wekeed" Seok-woo was broadcast in the Dynasty's roster preview video. The final two members for the inaugural season, Chae "Bunny" Jun-hyeok and Kim "KuKi" Dae-kuk, were revealed by Blizzard in November. Before the season started, Kim "EscA" In-jae retired.

Review

Regular season 
The Dynasty began the first stage of the regular season well, winning their first five games. However, after key losses to New York Excelsior, London Spitfire, and Los Angeles Valiant they fell out of Stage 1 playoff contention and finished the stage in fifth place, sparking discussions about a disappointing start to the season for a team favored to win it. They went on to finish fourth in the second stage as well, once again missing the stage playoffs. After the stage playoffs were expanded to include the team in fourth place, the Dynasty were predicted to be able to clinch a playoff spot thanks to their consistent fourth-place finishes in the prior stages, though their inability to defeat the top placing teams in the league brought up concerns over team management. With a rocky start to the third stage, coverage for the Dynasty shifted towards continued failure, with an article by ESPN's Emily Rand stating "Seoul's dynasty is already starting to crumble."

They once again failed to reach the playoffs in both the third and fourth stages of the regular season, going 5–5 in Stage 3 and 3–7 in Stage 4. Falling further behind the top teams in map differential. After finishing all four stages with worsening map scores, starting the first stage with a map differential of +9 and ending the last stage with a map differential of -6, the Dynasty fell out of season playoffs contention and finished the season in eighth place overall with a record of 22–18, a far cry from the expected and predicted success.

In response to their inability to clinch a playoff spot, the team underwent large coaching and staffing changes in July.

Final roster

Transactions 
Transactions of/for players on the roster during the 2018 regular season:
On February 26, Dynasty signed Heo "Gambler" Jin-woo.
On March 30, Dynasty transferred Chae "Bunny" Jun-hyeok to Los Angeles Valiant.

Standings

Record by stage

League

Game log

Preseason

Regular season

References 

2018 Overwatch League seasons by team
Seoul Dynasty
Seoul Dynasty seasons